Dongwuyuan station (动物园站, "Zoo Station") may refer to:

 Zoo station (Chongqing Rail Transit), a station on Line 2 of Chongqing Rail Transit
 Dongwuyuan (Beijing Zoo) station, a station on Line 4 of the Beijing Subway

See also
 Zoo station (disambiguation)